Bukholovo is a rural locality (a village) in Vladimir, Vladimir Oblast, Russia. The population was 1 as of 2010. There are 5 streets.

References 

Rural localities in Vladimir Urban Okrug